Alosa macedonica, or the Macedonian shad (also known as liparia), is a landlocked species of clupeid fish endemic to Greece. Its single natural occurrence is the freshwater Lake Volvi in northern Greece. It is threatened by habitat loss.

Biology
Alosa macedonica is a member of the genus Alosa, whose other species are often anadromous migrating between marine and freshwater. Research suggests that the ancestors of Alosa macedonica inhabited marine regions of the Aegean Sea.

Alosa macedonica have teeth in the palatine and vomer. They have approximately 50 vertebrae and 106-128 gill rakers. They are about 181-230mm in length and spawn around the months of July and August.

Apart from Lake Volvi, the species was previously present in Lake Koronia but in 1995 the lake dried up killing all the fish.

References

External links
 

macedonica
Endemic fauna of Greece
Freshwater fish of Europe
Vulnerable fish
Vulnerable biota of Europe
Fish described in 1921
Taxonomy articles created by Polbot